Alexander Joseph Ranald Shaw  (born 1971) is an English philosopher. He serves chairman of the Latin Mass Society, an organisation devoted to propagation of the Catholic Church's Tridentine Mass, and as president of Una Voce.

Shaw is the son of the late Thomas Shaw, 3rd Baron Craigmyle (1923–1998) and Anthea Craigmyle (née Rich) (1933–2016). He was educated at Ampleforth College and the University of Oxford.

He is currently a tutorial fellow in philosophy at St Benet's Hall, Oxford. His main areas of interest are practical ethics, the philosophy of religion and medieval philosophy. In 2015, he was elected a fellow of the Royal Society of Arts. A traditionalist Catholic, Shaw was a signatory of the 2017 "filial correction" Correctio filialis de haeresibus propagatis, which ascribed heretical content to Pope Francis's apostolic exhortation Amoris laetitia. Shaw was also an early critic of Pope Francis’s motu proprio Traditionis custodes, which abrogated permissions for celebration of the Tridentine Mass.

References

External links
 Joseph Shaw's Philosophy Blog
 

1971 births
21st-century English philosophers
Alumni of the University of Oxford
British ethicists
Catholic philosophers
Christian ethicists
English traditionalist Catholics
Fellows of St Benet's Hall, Oxford
Living people
People educated at Ampleforth College
Philosophers of religion
Scholars of medieval philosophy
Younger sons of barons